Wiwa may refer to:

People
Given name
Wiwa Korowi (born 1948), sixth Governor-General of Papua New Guinea
Surname
Jim Wiwa (1904–2005), chief of the Ogoni people of southern Nigeria, and the chairman of the Council of Chiefs of Bane
Ken Wiwa (1968–2016), also known as Ken Saro-Wiwa, Jr, Nigerian journalist and author
Ken Saro-Wiwa, (1941–1995), Nigerian writer, television producer, environmental activist
Noo Saro-Wiwa, British/Nigerian writer and journalist
Owens Wiwa (born 1957), Nigerian medical doctor and human rights activist
Zina Saro-Wiwa, Nigerian video artist and filmmaker

Others
Wiwa language, also known as Damana, Guamaco, Malayo, Sanja or Arosario), a Chibchan language spoken by around 2000 Wiwa south and east of Sierra Nevada de Santa Marta in northern Colombia
 WIWA (AM), a radio station (1270 AM) licensed to serve Eatonville, Florida, United States
 WRLZ (AM), a radio station (1160 AM) licensed to serve St. Cloud, Florida, which held the call sign WIWA from 2006 to 2019
Wiwa v. Royal Dutch Shell Co., three separate lawsuits brought by the family of Ken Saro-Wiwa against Royal Dutch Shell, its subsidiary Shell Nigeria and the subsidiary's CEO Brian Anderson, in the United States District Court for the Southern District of New York